Carlo Radice (born December 12, 1907, in Monza - date of death unknown) was a former Italian footballer. Radice was nicknamed "Il Vichingo" ("The Viking") by virtue of his Nordic appearance.

1907 births
Sportspeople from Monza
Italian footballers
Palermo F.C. players
S.S. Lazio players
U.S. Catanzaro 1929 players
Association football forwards
Serie A players
Serie B players
Year of death missing
Footballers from Lombardy